Laser Magnetic Storage International (LMSI) was a subsidiary of Philips that designed and manufactured optical and magnetic media. It began as a joint venture between Philips and Control Data Corporation. It later became Philips LMS.

Products
LMSI developed a proprietary CD-ROM interface. Early iterations relied on many 7400-series chips – on the CM 153 card for example. Later on, this bus was based on the highly integrated NCR chip – NCR © DIGBIE LMS 97644845-00 0390471 on the CM 260 for example.

 External CD-ROMs, LMSI interface
CDD 401: 1× speed (rebranded CM 221)
CDD 461: 1× speed
CDD 462: 1× speed (same as CDD 461 but with multi-session support)
CM 50: 1× speed
CM 100: 1× speed
CM 121: 1× speed
CM 221: 1× speed
CM 225: ?× speed

 External CD-ROMs, SCSI interface
CDD 521: 2× speed
CDD 522: 2× speed
CDD 552: ?× speed
CDD 2000: 4× speed
CDD 2600: 6× read, 2x write
CM 110: ?× speed
CM 231: 1× speed
CM 234: ?× speed

 Internal CD-ROMs, LMSI interface
CM 201: 1× speed
CM 205: 1× speed
CM 206: 2× speed
CM 210: ?× speed

 Internal CD-ROMs, SCSI interface
CM 121: 1× speed 
CM 201: 1× speed
CM 204: ?× speed
CM 212: ?× speed
CM 214: ?× speed
PCA80SC: 8× speed

 Internal CD-ROMs, IDE interface
CDD 3610: 6× speed
CDD 3801: 32× speed
CDD 4201: ?× speed
CDD 4401: ?× speed
CDD 4801: ?× speed
CM 202: 2× speed
CM 207: ?× speed
CM 208: ?× speed
CM 218: ?× speed

 ISA LMSI controller cards
CM 153: 8-bit ISA (coupled with the CM 100 and the CM 201)
CM 155: 8-bit ISA (coupled with the CM 100, the CM 201 and the CM 210)
CM 50 interface: 8-bit ISA (coupled with the CM 50)
CM 250: 8-bit ISA  (coupled with the CM 205)
CM 260: 16-bit ISA (coupled with the CM 206)

 Motherboard-integrated
Certain Tandy Sensation models featured a LMSI controller PCB connected to the motherboard.
The proprietary 16-pin LMSI CD-ROM interface was relatively short lived and existed on LMSI interface cards and a few ISA sound cards. These sound cards only have internal LMSI connectors, not the external DB-15 connector for external LMSI devices (the DB-15 on sound cards is the game port/UART MPU-401):
Sound Blaster Pro 2 CT1620
Sound Blaster 16 ASP CSP CT1780
Media Vision Jazz 16 LMSI
Pro Audio Spectrum LMSI
Pro Audio 16 LMSI
Generic 16-bit ISA cards with the Aztech AZTPR16 DSP (FCC ID 138-MMSN808)
Magnetic products were geared towards corporate mini computer environments (like the IBM AS/400):
LD 510: internal SCSI MO drive
LD 520: external MO drive
LD 1200: external WORM drive
LD 4100: cartridge optical storage
LD 6100: external WORM drive
LF 4500: cartridge optical storage

References

Philips
1986 establishments in Ontario
1992 disestablishments in Ontario
Compact Disc player manufacturers
Control Data Corporation
Defunct computer companies of Canada
Defunct computer hardware companies